Robert Baxter Clemens (August 9, 1886 – April 5, 1964) was a Major League Baseball outfielder who played with the St. Louis Browns in .

External links

1886 births
1964 deaths
Major League Baseball outfielders
Baseball players from Missouri
St. Louis Browns players
Waterloo Boosters players
Davenport Prodigals players
Davenport Blue Sox players
Oakland Oaks (baseball) players
Waco Navigators players
Richmond Climbers players
Richmond Virginians (minor league) players
People from Odessa, Missouri